Duncans Cove can refer to:

 Duncans Cove, a small bay in northern California
 Duncan's Cove, Nova Scotia